Sindian or Xindian refers to several places:

 Sindian Arrondissement, Senegal
Sindian, Senegal, a town in Senegal
 Xindian District, Taiwan
 Xindian Line (Taipei Metro), Taiwan
 Xindian River, Taiwan